Carlos Torrestorija is a Mexican actor, well known for his role in the TV series Gitanas. He was born on 28 October 1961, in Mexico, and he graduated from the Art Theatre school.

Personal life 
He was also known as Agustin Torres Torrija.

Television and filmography

External links 
 

Mexican male film actors
Mexican male telenovela actors
Living people
1968 births